Her Own People is a 1917 American drama silent film directed by Scott Sidney and written by Gardner Hunting and Julia Crawford Ivers. The film stars Lenore Ulric, Colin Chase, Howard Davies, Adelaide Woods, Jack Stark and Gail Brooks. The film was released on February 8, 1917, by Paramount Pictures.

Plot

Cast 
Lenore Ulric as Alona 
Colin Chase as Frank Colvin
Howard Davies as John Kemp
Adelaide Woods as Eleanor Dutton
Jack Stark as Jimmie Pope
Gail Brooks as Morning Star
Joy Lewis as Myra Agnew
William Jefferson (actor) as Blinn Agnew 
Ada Lewis as Mrs. Colvin
Mary Mersch as Katherine Colvin
William Steele as Pölsa Kar

References

External links 
 

1917 films
1910s English-language films
Silent American drama films
1917 drama films
Paramount Pictures films
American black-and-white films
American silent feature films
Films directed by Scott Sidney
1910s American films